Mersin İdmanyurdu (also Mersin İdman Yurdu, Mersin İY, or MİY) Sports Club; located in Mersin, east Mediterranean coast of Turkey in 1967–68. Mersin İdmanyurdu (MİY) football team played in Turkish First Football League, the first level division for the first time in 1967–68 season. They finished tenth. In their first season they have become one of the most scorer teams. In Turkish Cup they were eliminated at second round. Before the season MİT had sent an offer to former coach of Turkish national football team Sandro Puppo. However, later Cihat Arman has signed as coach. Bayram Birinci was trainer.

Executive committee: Faruk Miskavi (president); Mehmet Karamehmet (vice-president); Mahir Turan and Ünal Çıkmaz (deputy vice-presidents); Erol Tarhan (general captain); Turgut Atasagun (general secretary); Yılmaz Ok (treasurer); Sedattin Cömert (audit); Şükrü Soydan, Mustafa Tüzmen, Sadık Eliyeşil, Halit Gazioğlu, Aydın Özlü, Necati Bilkan, Sezai Sak, Sungur Baykurt (members).

Pre-season
Season was opened on 6 August 1967. Preparation games:
 13.08.1967 - MİY-Adanaspor: 3-2. Sunday, 16:30. MİY: Goals: Tarık, Kadri, Ali.
 MİY-Hatayspor: 5-2. MİY: Goals: Tarık (3), Kahraman, Osman.
 MİY-Tarsus İdmanyurdu: 6-2. MİY: Goals: Kahraman (4), Ali, Ayhan.
 27.08.1967 - MİY-Feriköy: 3-2. Sunday, 16:30. Mersin Stadium. MİY: Goals: Kadri 36', Tarık 48', Kahraman 89' Kahraman substituted Kadri. Feriköy: Goals: Ruli 79', Arif 13'.
 03.09.1967 - MİY-PTT: 2-1. Sunday, 16:15. Mersin. MİY: Goals: Ali, Osman. PTT: Goals: Ertan.

1967–68 First League participation
First League was played for the tenth time in 1967–68 season with 17 teams. Last three teams relegated to Second League 1968–69. Mersin İY became tenth in its first season at top level with 12 wins, and Osman Arpacıoğlu was the most scorer player of the team with 18 goals. He also played for national team.

Cihat Arman has resigned on 27.04.1968, one day before the 30th week game. Sezai Sak managed the team against Bursaspor. Before 31st round Turgay Şeren started to manage the team.

Results summary
Mersin İdmanyurdu (MİY) 1967–68 First League summary:

Sources: 1967–68 Turkish First Football League pages.

League table
Mersin İY's place in First League in 1967–68 season league table and game results are shown in the table below.

Note: Won, drawn and lost points are 2, 1 and 0. F belongs to MİY and A belongs to corresponding team for both home and away matches. Bay weeks for MİY are shown in respective raw.

Results by round
Results of games MİY played in 1967–68 First League by rounds:

First half

Mid-season
Friendly game:
 20.01.1968 - Feriköy-MİY.

Second half

1967–68 Turkish Cup participation
1967–68  Turkish Cup was played for the sixth season as Türkiye Kupası by 31 teams. Two elimination rounds (including one preliminary round) and finals were played in two-legs elimination system. Mersin İdmanyurdu participated in 1967–68  Turkish Cup from the first round and was eliminated at second round by Fenerbahçe. Fenerbahçe won the Cup for the first time.

Cup track
The drawings and results Mersin İdmanyurdu (MİY) followed in 1967–68 Turkish Cup are shown in the following table.

Note: In the above table 'Score' shows For and Against goals whether the match played at home or not.

Game details
Mersin İdmanyurdu (MİY) 1967–68 Turkish Cup game reports is shown in the following table.
Kick off times are in EET and EEST.

Source: 1967–68 Turkish Cup pages.

Management

Club management
Faruk Miskavi was club president.

Coaching team

1967–68 Mersin İdmanyurdu head coaches:

Note: Only official games were included.

1967–68 squad
Stats are counted for 1967–68 First League matches and 1967–68 Turkish Cup (Türkiye Kupası) matches. In the team rosters four substitutes were allowed to appear, two of whom were substitutable. Only the players who appeared in game rosters were included and listed in the order of appearance.

Sources: 1967–68 season squad data from maçkolik com, Milliyet, and Erbil (1975).

Transfer information from Milliyet:
 Transfers in (Summer 1967): Tarık Kutver (Galatasaray); Yetim Ali (Vefa); Yalçın (İstanbulspor); İhsan (Gençlerbirliği); Yunus, Halim (Ankaragücü); Kahraman (Ülküspor); Burhan (Karşıyaka); Abdullah (Altındağ); Ahmet (İzmir Egespor); Fikri (Davutpaşa); Mehmet (Tirespor); Adem (İstanbul Tekel). Molla Bachs and Abdül Cabbar (PAK) became the first foreign transfers of MİY (06.04.1968). Ogün (Beşiktaş) did also sign but later withdrew.
 Transfer out (December 1967): Nihat (Boluspor). Transfers out (Summer 1968): Yalçın (İstanbulspor); Yunus (Şekerspor); K.Tarık (Sakaryaspor). Doğan (Adana Demirspor). Mustafa, Mümtaz (Adanaspor). Fikri (Antalyaspor). Adem (Kayserispor). Kahraman (Manisaspor). Battal (Boluspor).

See also
 Football in Turkey
 1967–68 Turkish First Football League
 1967–68 Turkish Cup

Notes and references

Mersin İdman Yurdu seasons
Turkish football clubs 1967–68 season